Ersin Paşa is a quarter (mahalle) of Rizokarpaso in Northern Cyprus. De jure, Rizokarpaso is part of Cyprus.

References

Populated places in İskele District